The AJC St Leger is an historical Australian Turf Club Thoroughbred horse race run over 2,600 metres at Randwick Racecourse, Sydney, Australia run under set weights with penalties for stayers three - years and older.

History

The AJC St Leger is the oldest classic race in Australia derived from the English race and first run in 1841 as a 3YO event over 1½ miles at Homebush, Sydney and continued at the new Randwick Racecourse in 1861. Not run in 1854 & 1860 also 1960 – 1979 and 2002 – 2016.

The Principal race was re-instated by the AJC Committee again in 1980 graded at Group 2 level, encouraged by a direct descendent of Major General Anthony St Leger who instigated the St Leger Stakes, first run at Doncaster Racecourse in Northern England in 1776.

The race ended in 2001 and reappeared as the St Leger Stakes (ATC) in the Spring of 2017 with the expanded 15 million Everest carnival in October and since being reinstated has not received graded status.

Notable winners include Sky Heights (2001), Tie The Knot (2000), Linesman (1996), Castletown (1991), Tawrrific (1989), Beau Zam (1988), Handy Proverb (1986), Gurner's Lane (1982),Tulloch (1958), Sailor's Guide (1956), Hydrogen (1952), Playboy (1950), Carbon Copy (1949), Gold Rod (1937), Peter Pan (1933), Phar Lap (1930), Limerick (1927), Windbag (1925), Prince Foote (1910), Poseidon (1907) and Newhaven (1897).

Distance

 1841–1859 – 1 miles (~2400 metres)
 1861–1959 – 1 miles (~2800 metres)
 1980–2000 – 2800 metres
 2001 onwards – 2600 metres

Grade

 1841–1979 – Principal race
 1980–2001 – Group 2
 2018 onwards – Non graded

1932 & 1933 racebooks

Winners

 2022 - Stockman
 2021 – Warning
 2020 – Fun Fact
 2019 – Hush Writer
 2018 – Big Blue
 2017 – Big Duke
 2002–2016 – Race not held
 2001 – Sky Heights
 2000 – Tie The Knot
 1999 – Inshallah
 1998 – Bridleman
 1997 – Interval
 1996 – Linesman
 1995 – Beaux Art
 1994 – Gold Sovereign
 1993 – Te Akau Nick
 1992 – Tuff Enuff
 1991 – Castletown
 1990 – Chaleyer
 1989 – Tawrrific
 1988 – Beau Zam
 1987 – Argonaut Style
 1986 – Handy Proverb
 1985 – Duanettes Girl
 1984 – Port Fair
 1983 – Forward Charge
 1982 – Gurner's Lane
 1981 – November Rain
 1980 – Shogun
 1960–1979 – Race not held
 1959 – Bardshah 
 1958 – Tulloch
 1957 – Monte Carlo
 1956 – Sailor's Guide
 1955 – Pride Of Egypt
 1954 – Monarch
 1953 – Sea Sovereign
 1952 – Hydrogen
 1951 – Aristocrat
 1950 – Playboy
 1949 – Carbon Copy
 1948 – Cronides
 1947 – Vigaro
 1946 – Gay Lad
 1945 – Accession
 1944 – Mayfowl
 1943 – Modulation
 1942 – Its Funny
 1941 – Lucrative
 1940 – Reading
 1939 – Mosaic
 1938 – John Wilkes
 1937 – Gold Rod
 1936 – Allunga 
 1935 – Sylvandale
 1934 – Limarch
 1933 – Peter Pan
 1932 – Middle Watch
 1931 – Veilmond
 1930 – Phar Lap
 1929 – Strephon
 1928 – Winalot
 1927 – Limerick
 1926 – Belgamba
 1925 – Windbag
 1924 – Lady Valais
 1923 – Sir Andrew
 1922 – Harvest King
 1921 – Salitros
 1920 – Millieme
 1919 – Finmark
 1918 – Prince Viridis
 1917 – Thana
 1916 – Kandos
 1915 – Mountain Knight
 1914 – Radnor
 1913 – Wolawa
 1912 – Jacamar
 1911 – Cadonia
 1910 – Prince Foote 
 1909 – Lord Nolan
 1908 – Mountain King
 1907 – Poseidon
 1906 – Lady Wallace
 1905 – Dividend
 1904 – Emir
 1903 – Abundance
 1902 – Sir Leonard
 1901 – Clean Sweep
 1900 – Parthian
 1899 – Johansen
 1898 – Amberite
 1897 – Newhaven
 1896 – Wallace
 1895 – Cobbity
 1894 – The Sailor Prince
 1893 – Camoola
 1892 – La Tosca
 1891 – Correze
 1890 – Dreadnought
 1889 – Melos
 1888 – Abercorn
 1887 – Trident
 1886 – Matchlock
 1885 – Silver King
 1884 – Legrand
 1883 – Navigator
 1882 – Wheatear
 1881 – Progress
 1880 – Petrea
 1879 – Bosworth
 1878 – Cap-A-Pie
 1877 – Robinson Crusoe 
 1876 – Robin Hood
 1875 – Kingsborough
 1874 – Goldsbrough
 1873 – Commodore
 1872 – Hamlet
 1871 – Lady Clifden
 1870 – Moselle
 1869 – Coquette
 1868 – Glencoe
 1867 – Fishhook
 1866 – The Pitsford
 1865 – Yattendon
 1864 – Ramornie
 1863 – Regno
 1862 – Exeter
 1861 – Alfred
 1860 – Race not held
 1859 – The Don 
 1858 – Chevalier
 1857 – Lauristina
 1856 – Stumpy
 1855 – Bay Camden
 1854 – Race not held
 1853 – Cooramin
 1852 – Surplice
 1851 – Plover
 1850 – Cossack
 1849 – Pastile
 1848 – Snake
 1847 – Whalebone
 1846 – Lady Theorem
 1845 – Peter From Athlone
 1844 – Blue Bonnet
 1843 – Marchioness
 1842 – Beeswing
 1841 – Eleanor

References 

Horse races in Australia
Randwick Racecourse